Alexey Vitalyevich Ashapatov (born 30 October 1973) is a Russian para-athlete competing mainly in category F57-58 throwing events.

He competed in the 2008 Summer Paralympics in Beijing, China. There he won two gold medals, one in the men's F57-58 shot put and the other in the men's F57-58 discus throw. He won the same events four years later, at the 2012 Summer Paralympics in London, United Kingdom.

External links

 
Алексей Витальевич Ашапатов. paralimpics.ru
Ашапатов Алексей. csi-ugra.ru

Paralympic athletes of Russia
Athletes (track and field) at the 2008 Summer Paralympics
Athletes (track and field) at the 2012 Summer Paralympics
Paralympic gold medalists for Russia
Perm State University alumni
Living people
1973 births
World record holders in Paralympic athletics
Wheelchair shot putters
Wheelchair discus throwers
Medalists at the 2008 Summer Paralympics
Medalists at the 2012 Summer Paralympics
Paralympic medalists in athletics (track and field)
Athletes (track and field) at the 2020 Summer Paralympics
Paralympic shot putters
Paralympic discus throwers
21st-century Russian people